Mamué is a commune of Angola, located in the province of Namibe.

See also 

 Communes of Angola

References 

Populated places in Namibe Province